The U.S. Senate Environment and Public Works Subcommittee on Chemical Safety, Waste Management, Environmental Justice and Regulatory Oversight is one a subcommittee of the U.S. Senate Committee on Environment and Public Works.

Jurisdiction 
Superfund and Waste Issues
 Environmental Protection Agency’s Office of Land and Emergency Management (OLEM)
 Superfund Program
 Brownfields Program
 Solid Waste Disposal Act
 Resource Conservation and Recovery Act, including recycling and electronic recycling, federal facilities and interstate waste
 Comprehensive Environmental Response, Compensation, and Liability Act
 Emergency Planning and Community Right to Know Act
 Solid waste disposal and recycling

Chemical Issues
 Environmental Protection Agency’s Office of Pollution Control and Prevention (OCSPP)
 Chemical Safety and Hazardous Investigation Board
 Toxic Substances Control Act
 Toxics Release Inventory
 Chemical Policy, including Chemical Security
 Persistent organic pollutants
 Risk Assessment
 Environmental effects of toxic substances, other than pesticides

Regulatory Oversight
 Council on Environmental Quality
 Morris K. Udall and Stewart L. Udall Foundation
 National Environmental Policy Act (NEPA) 
 Responsibility for oversight of agencies, departments, and programs within the jurisdiction of the full committee, including oversight of environmental research and development, and for conducting investigations within such jurisdiction (The oversight jurisdiction pertains to good governance matters like mismanagement of federal funds and personnel issues, but not to policy matters like those within the jurisdiction of other subcommittees)
 Environmental research and development

History
The subcommittee was formerly known as the Subcommittee on Superfund and Environmental Health, but was renamed during committee organization of the 111th Congress to reflect its jurisdiction over major federal environmental health laws. From the 111th to the 116th Congress it was named Subcommittee on Superfund, Waste Management, and Regulatory Oversight.

Members, 118th Congress

References

External links
Official Subcommittee page

Environment and Public Works Senate Superfund and Environmental Health